This is a list of indoor arenas in India that have been used for major indoor matches. The minimum capacity is 1,000.

Indoor stadiums

See also 

 List of cricket grounds in India
 List of stadiums in Hyderabad
 List of stadiums in India
 List of international cricket grounds in India
 List of Field hockey venues in India 
 List of football stadiums in India
 Venues of the 2010 Commonwealth Games

References

External links
 www.sangamnersports.8m.com
 india.cricketworld4u.com

Indoor
Indoor arenas in India
India